In mathematics, Lie group–Lie algebra correspondence allows one to correspond a Lie group to a Lie algebra or vice versa, and study the conditions for such a relationship. Lie groups that are isomorphic to each other have Lie algebras that are isomorphic to each other, but the converse is not necessarily true. However, by restricting our attention to the simply connected Lie groups, the Lie group-Lie algebra correspondence will be one-to-one.

In this article, a Lie group refers to a real Lie group. For the complex and p-adic cases, see complex Lie group and p-adic Lie group. In this article, manifolds (in particular Lie groups) are assumed to be second countable; in particular, they have at most countably many connected components.

Basics

The Lie algebra of a Lie group
There are various ways one can understand the construction of the Lie algebra of a Lie group G. One approach uses left-invariant vector fields. A vector field X on G is said to be invariant under left translations if, for any g, h in G,

Let  be the set of all left-translation-invariant vector fields on G. It is a real vector space. Moreover, it is closed under Lie bracket; i.e.,  is left-translation-invariant if X, Y are. Thus,  is a Lie subalgebra of the Lie algebra of all vector fields on G and is called the Lie algebra of G. One can understand this more concretely by identifying the space of left-invariant vector fields with the tangent space at the identity, as follows: Given a left-invariant vector field, one can take its value at the identity, and given a tangent vector at the identity, one can extend it to a left-invariant vector field. This correspondence is one-to-one in both directions, so is bijective. Thus, the Lie algebra can be thought of as the tangent space at the identity and the bracket of X and Y in  can be computed by extending them to left-invariant vector fields, taking the bracket of the vector fields, and then evaluating the result at the identity.

Matrix Lie groups
Suppose G is a closed subgroup of GL(n;C), and thus a Lie group, by the closed subgroups theorem. Then the Lie algebra of G may be computed as

For example, one can use the criterion to establish the correspondence for classical compact groups (cf. the table in "compact Lie groups" below.)

Homomorphisms
If

is a Lie group homomorphism, then its differential at the identity element

is a Lie algebra homomorphism (brackets go to brackets), which has the following properties:
 for all X in Lie(G), where "exp" is the exponential map
.<ref>More generally, if H is a closed subgroup of H, then </ref>
If the image of f is closed, then  and the first isomorphism theorem holds: f induces the isomorphism of Lie groups:

Also, if f is injective, then f is an immersion and so G is said to be an immersed (Lie) subgroup of H. For example,  is an immersed subgroup of H. If f is surjective, then f is a submersion and if, in addition, G is compact, then f is a principal bundle with the structure group its kernel. (Ehresmann's lemma)

Other properties

Let  be a direct product of Lie groups and  projections. Then the differentials  give the canonical identification:

If  are Lie subgroups of a Lie group, then 

Let G be a connected Lie group. If H is a Lie group, then any Lie group homomorphism  is uniquely determined by its differential . Precisely, there is the exponential map  (and one for H) such that  and, since G is connected, this determines f uniquely. In general, if U is a neighborhood of the identity element in a connected topological group G, then  coincides with G, since the former is an open (hence closed) subgroup. Now,  defines a local homeomorphism from a neighborhood of the zero vector to the neighborhood of the identity element.

 The correspondence 
The correspondence between Lie groups and Lie algebras includes the following three main results.Lie's third theorem: Every finite-dimensional real Lie algebra is the Lie algebra of some  simply connected Lie group. The homomorphisms theorem: If  is a Lie algebra homomorphism and if G is simply connected, then there exists a (unique) Lie group homomorphism  such that .
In the second part of the correspondence, the assumption that G is simply connected cannot be omitted. For example, the Lie algebras of SO(3) and SU(2) are isomorphic, but there is no corresponding homomorphism of SO(3) into SU(2). Rather, the homomorphism goes from the simply connected group SU(2) to the non-simply connected group SO(3). If G and H are both simply connected and have isomorphic Lie algebras, the above result allows one to show that G and H are isomorphic. One method to construct f is to use the Baker–Campbell–Hausdorff formula.

For readers familiar with category theory the correspondence can be summarised as follows: First, the operation of associating to each connected Lie group  its Lie algebra , and to each homomorphism  of Lie groups the corresponding differential  at the neutral element, is a (covariant) functor 
 from the category
of connected (real) Lie groups to the category of finite-dimensional (real) Lie-algebras. This functor has a left adjoint functor  from (finite dimensional) Lie algebras to Lie groups
(which is necessarily unique up to canonical isomorphism). In other words
there is a natural isomorphism of bifunctors

 is the (up to isomorphism unique) simply-connected Lie group with Lie algebra 
with Lie group . 
The associated natural unit morphisms   of the adjunction are isomorphisms, which corresponds to  being fully faithful 
(part of the second statement above).
The corresponding counit  is the canonical projection 
 from the 
simply connected covering; its surjectivity corresponds to  being a faithful functor.

Proof of Lie's third theorem
Perhaps the most elegant proof of the first result above uses Ado's theorem, which says any finite-dimensional Lie algebra (over a field of any characteristic) is a Lie subalgebra of the Lie algebra  of square matrices. The proof goes as follows: by Ado's theorem, we assume  is a Lie subalgebra. Since , this completes the proof.

Example: Each element X in the Lie algebra  gives rise to the Lie algebra homomorphism

Proof of the homomorphisms theorem
One approach to proving the second part of the Lie group-Lie algebra correspondence (the homomorphisms theorem) is to use the Baker–Campbell–Hausdorff formula, as in Section 5.7 of Hall's book.

where  is the exponential map for G, which has an inverse defined near the identity. We now argue that f is a local homomorphism. According to the Baker–Campbell–Hausdorff formula, we have , where 

with  indicating other terms expressed as repeated commutators involving X and Y. Thus, 

because  is a Lie algebra homomorphism. Using the Baker–Campbell–Hausdorff formula again, this time for the group H, we see that this last expression becomes , and therefore we have

Thus, f has the homomorphism property, at least when X and Y are sufficiently small. It is important to emphasize that this argument is only local, since the exponential map is only invertible in a small neighborhood of the identity in G and since the Baker–Campbell–Hausdorff formula only holds if X and Y are small. The assumption that G is simply connected has not yet been used..

The next stage in the argument is to extend f from a local homomorphism to a global one. The extension is done by defining f along a path and then using the simple connectedness of G to show that the definition is independent of the choice of path.

 Lie group representations 
A special case of Lie correspondence is a correspondence between finite-dimensional representations of a Lie group and representations of the associated Lie algebra.

The general linear group  is a (real) Lie group and any Lie group homomorphism

is called a representation of the Lie group G. The differential

is then a Lie algebra homomorphism called a Lie algebra representation.

Consider, for example, the rotation group SO(3), which is not simply connected. There is one irreducible representation of the Lie algebra in each dimension, but only the odd-dimensional representations of the Lie algebra come from representations of the group. (This observation is related to the distinction between integer spin and half-integer spin in quantum mechanics.) On the other hand, the group SU(2) is simply connected with Lie algebra isomorphic to that of SO(3), so every representation of the Lie algebra of SO(3) does give rise to a representation of SU(2). 

The adjoint representation
An example of a Lie group representation is the adjoint representation of a Lie group G; each element g in a Lie group G defines an automorphism of G by conjugation: ; the differential  is then an automorphism of the Lie algebra . This way, we get a representation , called the adjoint representation.

( is in general not a closed subgroup; only an immersed subgroup.) If G is connected, it fits into the exact sequence:

where  is the center of G. If the center of G is discrete, then Ad here is a covering map.

Let G be a connected Lie group. Then G is unimodular if and only if  for all g in G.

Let G be a Lie group acting on a manifold X and Gx the stabilizer of a point x in X. Let . Then

be the Lie algebra centralizer and the Lie group centralizer of A. Then .

If H is a closed connected subgroup of G, then H is normal if and only if  is an ideal and in such a case .

 Abelian Lie groups 

Let G be a connected Lie group. Since the Lie algebra of the center of G is the center of the Lie algebra of G (cf. the previous §), G is abelian if and only if its Lie algebra is abelian.

If G is abelian, then the exponential map  is a surjective group homomorphism. By the first isomorphism theorem,  induces the isomorphism .

By the rigidity argument, the fundamental group  of a connected Lie group G is a central subgroup of a simply connected covering  of G; in other words, G fits into the central extension

For the complex case, complex tori are important; see complex Lie group for this topic.

 Compact Lie groups 

Let G be a connected Lie group with finite center. Then the following are equivalent.G is compact.
(Weyl) The simply connected covering  of G is compact.
The adjoint group  is compact.
There exists an embedding  as a closed subgroup.
It is important to emphasize that the equivalence of the preceding conditions holds only under the assumption that G has finite center. Thus, for example, if G is compact with finite center, the universal cover  is also compact. Clearly, this conclusion does not hold if G has infinite center, e.g., if . The last three conditions above are purely Lie algebraic in nature.

If G is a compact Lie group, then

 Related constructions 
Let G be a Lie group. The associated Lie algebra  of G may be alternatively defined as follows. Let  be the algebra of distributions on G with support at the identity element with the multiplication given by convolution.  is in fact a Hopf algebra.

See also 
Compact Lie algebra
Milnor–Moore theorem
Formal group
Malcev Lie algebra
Distribution on a linear algebraic group

Citations

References

External links 
Notes for Math 261A Lie groups and Lie algebras

Formal Lie theory in characteristic zero, a blog post by Akhil Mathew

Differential geometry
Lie algebras
Lie groups
Manifolds